Chérancé is the name of the following communes in France:

 Chérancé, Mayenne, in the Mayenne department
 Chérancé, Sarthe, in the Sarthe department

See also
Chérencé (disambiguation)